Pedro Ponce de Léon, O.P. (born 1561) was a Roman Catholic prelate who served as Bishop of Zamora (1610–1615) and Bishop of Ciudad Rodrigo (1605–1610).

Biography
Pedro Ponce de Léon was born in Córdoba, Spain in 1561 and ordained a priest in the Order of Preachers.
On 31 August 1605, he was appointed during the papacy of Pope Paul V as Bishop of Ciudad Rodrigo.
On 30 October 1605, he was consecrated bishop by Luis Fernández de Córdoba, Bishop of Salamanca, with Fernando Suárez de Figueroa, Bishop of Zamora, and Salvador Ribera Avalos, Bishop of Quito, serving as co-consecrators. 
On 29 March 1610, he was appointed during the papacy of Pope Paul V as Bishop of Zamora.
He served as Bishop of Zamora until his resignation in 1615.

References

External links and additional sources
 (for Chronology of Bishops) 
 (for Chronology of Bishops) 
 (for Chronology of Bishops) 
 (for Chronology of Bishops) 

17th-century Roman Catholic bishops in Spain
Bishops appointed by Pope Paul V
1561 births
People from Córdoba, Spain
Dominican bishops